János Boldóczki (according to other sources János Boldoczki; 22 August 1912 – 23 December 1988) was a Hungarian politician, who served as Minister of Foreign Affairs between 1953 and 1956. He was member of the Hungarian Communist Party since 1944. From 1950 he was the Hungarian ambassador to Czechoslovakia and from 1956 to the Soviet Union. He kept his position during the Hungarian Revolution of 1956. After that Boldóczki served as ambassador to Mongolia.

References

 Magyar Távirati Iroda 1956

1912 births
1988 deaths
People from Tótkomlós
People from the Kingdom of Hungary
Hungarian Communist Party politicians
Members of the Hungarian Working People's Party
Members of the Hungarian Socialist Workers' Party
Foreign ministers of Hungary
Hungarian diplomats
Ambassadors of Hungary to Mongolia
Ambassadors of Hungary to Czechoslovakia
Ambassadors of Hungary to the Soviet Union